Fèng is a relatively common Chinese surname.  It is the 54th name on the Hundred Family Surnames poem.  It has the same radical-frame with, and therefore appears similar to, a less common surname Feng ("wind" 風, simplified 风 with a flat first tone), but "phoenix" is pronounced with a falling fourth tone fèng.

Origin of various Feng family
Gaoxin family of Ancient China period 
Ji (surname) of Zhou Dynasty period
Hui people the Arab people after Han Dynasty period
Feng (family name) (风) in the any dynasty period
Public Office name of Tang Dynasty period 
Khitan people  of Liao Dynasty period
 Mongolian the Donghu people in the any dynasty period

See also
Fang (surname)
Bong (surname)

References

Surnames
Chinese-language surnames